St Mary's Hall is a municipal building in Bayley Lane in Coventry, West Midlands, England. It is a Grade I listed building.

History

The building was built in the Medieval style between 1340 and 1342 and much altered and extended in 1460. 

The guildhall originally served as the headquarters of the merchant guild of St Mary, and subsequently of the united guilds of the Holy Trinity, St Mary, St John the Baptist and St Katherine. Following the suppression of the chantries and religious guilds under King Edward VI in 1547, for a time it served as the city's armoury and as its treasury (until 1822), as well as the headquarters for administration for the city council (until the Council House opened in 1920).

In November 1569, following the Catholic Rising of the North, Mary, Queen of Scots was rushed south from Tutbury Castle to Coventry. Elizabeth I sent a letter, instructing the people of Coventry to look after Mary. She suggested  that Mary be held somewhere secure such as Coventry Castle. However, by that time the castle was too decayed and Mary was instead first held at the Bull Inn, Smithford Street before being moved to the Mayoress's Parlour in St Mary's Guildhall. Following the defeat of the rebels, Mary was once more sent north to Chatsworth in May 1570.

On 3 April 1604 Princess Elizabeth and her ladies rode from Coombe Abbey to Coventry. She heard a sermon in St Michael's Church and dined in St Mary's Hall. Prince Henry rode to Coventry from Leicester on 20 August 1612 and had supper in St Mary's Hall. He stayed at a house in Little Park street.

George Eld, mayor of Coventry (1834–5) was an antiquarian who encouraged appreciation of Coventry's ancient buildings. He initiated the restoration of the fourteenth-century interior of the mayoress's parlour.

In 1861, the artist David Gee painted The Godiva Procession Leaving St Mary's Hall, which is now on display in the Herbert Art Gallery and Museum, Coventry.

Restoration work by the council received the approval of the committee of the Coventry City Guild in 1930. Improvements had included the repair of the door at the north entrance to the crypt and providing glass and grilles in the windows of the fore crypt. Outside the crumbling exterior stonework was stabilized. The building also has a vaulted undercroft which is currently used as a restaurant.

The building retains a collection of royal portraits from the seventeenth to nineteenth centuries, arms and armour, fine stained glass and one of the country's most important tapestries dating from circa 1500. Works of art include a portrait by John Shackleton of King George I, a portrait by Godfrey Kneller of Queen Caroline of Ansbach and a marble statue by William Calder Marshall of Lady Godiva.

See also
 Guild
 Guildhall

References

External links

Buildings and structures in Coventry
History of Coventry
Guildhalls in the United Kingdom
Grade I listed buildings in the West Midlands (county)